The Irish American Cultural Institute (IACI) is an American cultural group founded  in Saint Paul, Minnesota  by Dr. Eoin McKiernan in 1962. The group's purpose is to promote an intelligent appreciation of Ireland and the role and contributions of the Irish in America culture. It also sponsors research and awards prizes in the field of Irish Studies. It also awards the Annie Moore Award, which is given "to an individual who has made significant contributions to the Irish and/or Irish American community and legacy."

From 1962 to 1995, the Institute was hosted by the College of St. Thomas (now the University of St. Thomas (Minnesota)). In 1995, the organization moved its headquarters to Morristown, New Jersey.

Publications
The Institute publishes:
 Éire-Ireland, a scholarly journal.
 Ducas, a newsletter

Patron
Its current patron is Michael D. Higgins, the President of Ireland.

References

External links
IACI website
Irish American Cultural Institute Records at the University of St. Thomas

Celtic studies
History of the Republic of Ireland
American
Irish-American history
Organizations established in 1962
Politics of Ireland